Anthony James Cafiero (February 11, 1900 – September 28, 1982) was a member of the New Jersey Senate from 1949 to 1953.

Biography 
Anthony James Cafiero was born on February 11, 1900, in Philadelphia, Pennsylvania, the son of a Philadelphia barber. He moved to North Wildwood, New Jersey in 1921. He was the Cape May County prosecutor from 1944 to 1946, and was a county judge in Cape May County from 1946 to 1948. He was a member of the New Jersey Senate, representing Cape May County as a Republican, from 1948 to 1954. He served in the New Jersey Superior Court from 1954 until retiring in 1970. He died on September 28, 1982, in Middle Township, New Jersey.

Family 
He married Hazel Koenig in 1926. Their son, James S. Cafiero, served in the New Jersey Senate and General Assembly.

References 

1900 births
1982 deaths
Republican Party New Jersey state senators
People from Philadelphia
People from North Wildwood, New Jersey